Solaris is the only synchrotron in Central-Eastern Europe. Built in Poland in 2015, under the auspices of the Jagiellonian University, it is located on the Campus of the 600th Anniversary of the Jagiellonian University Revival, in the southern part of Krakow. It is the central facility of the National Center of Synchrotron Radiation SOLARIS.

The National Synchrotron Radiation Center SOLARIS was built between 2011 and 2014. The investment was co-financed by the European Union with funds from the European Regional Development Fund, as part of the Innovative Economy Operational Program for 2007–2013.

The SOLARIS synchrotron began operation with two beamlines (PEEM/XAS with two end-stations, and UARPES with one end-station). Ultimately, however, the experimental hall of the Kraków accelerator will house dozens of them. In total, the beamlines will be fitted with about twenty end-stations.

It is named  after the title of a novel by the Polish science fiction writer Stanislaw Lem, who lived and worked in Kraków.

On March 1, 2019, at the First Congress of the Cryomicroscopy Consortium, a body gathering specialists in structural biology from all over Poland, an official decision was made to open the National Center for Electron Cryomicroscopy in SOLARIS. The heart of the Cryomicroscopy Center has become two, the newest generation, cryomicroscopes which, due to their high resolution and measurement method, revolutionize structural biology.

Research
The SOLARIS Center is open for all interested scientists, both from Poland and abroad. Calls for proposals are announced twice during a year (in spring and autumn). The access to the infrastructure for scientists is free of charge.

Beamlines

There are several beamlines.

Active beamlines

 XAS is a bending magnet based beamline dedicated to microscopy and spectroscopy in the soft X-rays energy range. The beamline is designed to study chemical and electronic, structural and magnetic properties by means of XAS, XNLD (X-ray natural linear dichroism) and XMCD (X-ray magnetic circular dichroism), XMLD (X-ray magnetic linear dichroism), respectively. It is suitable for probing element specific properties of surfaces, interfaces, thin films and nanomaterials. The available photon energy range (200–2000 eV) covers the absorption K edges for light elements, from carbon to silicon, L edges of elements with Z between 20 and 40, including 3d elements, and also M edges of many heavier atoms, including 4f elements. The offered experimental station is a universal station for X-ray absorption spectroscopy (XAS).

The station is available for user's experiments in different sample environments and focusing conditions. Users can apply for beamtime with the XAS end station. In order to prepare for their experiment, users are asked to look at the end stations' webpages.

 UARPES - Ultra angle-resolved photoemission spectroscopy beamline allows for measurements of fundamental quantities, i.e. the energy and the momentum, describing a photoelectron state in the space outside the solid sample.

If a spin selector is used additionally, a complete set of quantum numbers for the electron may be obtained. Then, within a so-called sudden approximation, the electron energy, momentum and spin measured over the sample surface may be related, to binding energy, quasimomentum, and spin, that the electron had in the solid before the photoelectric event took place. Thus the electronic band structure of the studied solid is obtained experimentally. Beside this simple picture ARPES gives also detailed insights into complex electron – electron and electron – lattice interactions in the solid.

The importance of the ARPES technique for contemporary science and technology is widely recognized. Dedicated ARPES beamlines exist at almost all synchrotron radiation centers worldwide.

Applications:
Many recent advances in materials science have been enabled by better understanding of the electronic structure of complex systems, gained due to ARPES studies. Examples include advances in fields such as: high temperature superconductivity, topological insulators, graphene physics.

 PHELIX - the beamline is using soft X-rays produced by an APPLE II undulator with permanent magnets. This undulator allows to obtain variable polarization of light - linear, circular and elliptical. The beamline enables spectroscopic absorption studies. The available research techniques on the beamline are: photoemission spectroscopy (PES) and XAS. Application: in the study of new materials (spintronics, magnetoelectronics, topological insulators) as well as thin layers and multilayers.
 DEMETER - (Dual Microscopy and Electron Spectroscopy Beamline) - the beamline is using soft X-rays with variable polarization emitted by an EPU (elliptically polarizing undulator) undulator. The beamline has two end stations: STXM scanning X-ray transmission microscope and PEEM photoemission electron microscope. Application: magnetic order research, domain structure research, imaging of chemical composition and spectroscopy of biomolecules.

Beamlines under construction

 SOLABS  - an X-ray absorption spectroscopy beamline, whose synchrotron light source will be a bending magnet. The line will deliver photons within a broad energy range, allowing measurements to be conducted at the absorption edges of many elements.

Applications: The endstation will be intended for materials research of both a basic and applied nature.

 SOLCRYS - a wiggler-based, high energy X-ray beamline (up to 25 keV) for structural studies.  Applications: in structural studies (biological, macromolecular, pharmaceutical, crystalline materials, etc.) also performed under extreme conditions (high pressure, temperature).
 SOLAIR - the beamline of infrared absorption microscopy with imaging. The source of radiation is a curving magnet. The beamline will have two end stations: a microscope with infrared radiation with Fourier transform and a microscope for nano-infrared spectroscopy coupled with atomic force microscopy and scanning near-field microscopy (AFM-SNOM-FTIR imaging). Application: in biomedicine, nanotechnology, environmental sciences and many other fields. The planned research will allow, among other things, to direct the synthesis of potential drugs and their design.
 POLYX - a beamline which will enable high-resolution multi-modal imaging in the hard X-ray range. The source of radiation is a curving magnet. Techniques available will be: X-ray fluorescence microanalysis (micro-XRF), X-ray absorption threshold spectroscopy (micro-XAFS) and computed micro-tomography (micro-CT). Application: testing new solutions for X-ray optics and detectors, testing low-absorbing samples, e.g. biological materials, obtaining depth information about elemental decomposition, morphological studies of objects, three-dimensional imaging of the local atomic structure, etc.

Parameters 
The SOLARIS storage ring main parameters:

Energy: 1.5 GeV          
 Max. current: 500 mA
 Circumference: 96 m
Main RF frequency: 99,93 MHz
 Max. number of circulating bunches: 32
 Horizontal emittance (without insertion devices): 6 nm rad
 Coupling: 1%
 Tune Qx, Qy: 11.22; 3.15
 Natural chromaticity ξx, ξy: -22.96, -17.14
 Corrected chromaticity ξx, ξy: +1, +1
 Electron beam size (straight section center) σx, σy: 184 µm, 13 µm
 Electron beam size (dipole center) σx, σy: 44 μm, 30 μm
 Max. number of insertion devices: 10
 Momentum compaction: 3.055 x 10-3
 Total lifetime of electrons: 13 h

References

External links 
 webpage of National Synchrotron Radiation Centre SOLARIS
 webpage of lightsource.org
Digital User Office

Jagiellonian University
Synchrotron radiation
Commemoration of Stanisław Lem